Utricularia praelonga is a medium-sized to large perennial carnivorous plant that belongs to the genus Utricularia. U. praelonga, a terrestrial species, is endemic to South America, where it is found in northern Argentina, southern Brazil, and Paraguay.

See also 
 List of Utricularia species

References

External links 
Inner World of Utricularia praelonga from the John Innes Centre

Carnivorous plants of South America
Flora of Argentina
Flora of Brazil
Flora of Paraguay
praelonga